The Electronic Frontier Foundation is regularly involved in litigation. The following is a list of cases that have involved the EFF to some degree.

Analog hole
Macrovision v. Sima

Anonymity
Burd v. Cole
Doe v. Cahill
Dominick v. MySpace
E. Van Cullens v. John Doe
First Cash v. John Doe
Fix Wilson Yard v. City of Chicago
Manalapan v. Moskovitz
Merkey v. Yahoo SCOX, Groklaw et. al.
Mobilisa v. Doe
RIAA v. Verizon Case Archive
USA Technologies v. Stokklerk

Bloggers' rights
Apple v. Does
Barrett v. Rosenthal
Eli Lilly Zyprexa Litigation
Online Policy Group v. Diebold, Inc.
Spocko and ABC/KSFO
ALA v. FCC
Coders' Rights Project
Blizzard v. BNETD
In Re: Matter of Search Warrant (Boston College)
Lexmark v. Static Control Case Archive
MBTA v. Anderson
OdioWorks v Apple
US v. ElcomSoft Sklyarov
CyberSLAPP
Ampex v. Cargle Case Archive
Burd v. Cole
E. Van Cullens v. John Doe
First Cash v. John Doe
Merkey v. Yahoo SCOX, Groklaw et. al.
Mobilisa v. Doe
Naas v. Anonymizer et al.

Digital rights management
2006 DMCA Rulemaking
Macrovision v. Sima
RealNetworks v. DVD-CCA (RealDVD case)
Sony BMG Litigation Info
United States v. Elcom Ltd.
Macrovision v. Sima
Paramount v. ReplayTV
Digital Millennium Copyright Act
Blizzard v. BNETD
Chamber of Commerce v. Servin
Lexmark v. Static Control Case Archive
Macrovision v. Sima
RealNetworks v. DVD-CCA (RealDVD case)
RIAA v. Charter Communications Archive
RIAA v. Verizon Case Archive
StorageTek v. Custom Hardware
DMCA Rulemaking
2000 DMCA Rulemaking
2003 DMCA Rulemaking
2006 DMCA Rulemaking
2009 DMCA Rulemaking
E-Voting Rights
Diebold v. North Carolina Board of Elections
National Federation of the Blind v. Volusia County
Online Policy Group v. Diebold
Sarasota County Re-vote Filing
White v. Blackwell: Creating True Verifiability in a Battleground State

File sharing
Aimster
Arista Records LLC v. Lime Group LLC
Atlantic v. Howell
BUMA v Kazaa
Capitol v. Foster
Capitol v. Thomas
Elektra v. Dennis
Fonovisa v. Alvarez
In re: Sony BMG Music Entertainment, et. al
Interscope v. Leadbetter
Lava v. Amurao
MGM v. Grokster
Napster Cases Archive
RIAA v. Charter Communications Archive
RIAA v. The People

Free speech
Abourezk v. ProBush.com
ACLU v. Reno II
Ampex v. Cargle Case Archive
Apple v. Does
Bank Julius Baer & Co v. Wikileaks
Barrett v. Rosenthal
Bauer v. Wikimedia et al
Bernstein v. United States
Burd v. Cole
Chamber of Commerce v. Servin
 Chicago Auto Show SHUTDOWN
CLC v. Craigslist
Commonwealth of Kentucky v. 141 Internet Domain Names
Diehl v. Crook
Doe v. Cahill
Dominick v. MySpace
DontDateHimGirl.com
E. Van Cullens v. John Doe
eBay v. MercExchange
Electric Slide Litigation
Eli Lilly Zyprexa Litigation
Embroidery Software Protection Coalition v. Ebert & Weaver
First Cash v. John Doe
Fix Wilson Yard v. City of Chicago
Frankel v. Lyons (Barney)
Fuller v. Doe
Indymedia Server Takedown
JibJab Media v. Ludlow Music ("This Land" Parody)
Johnson v. Barras
Junger v. Daley
Landmark and the Internet Archive
Long Haul v Regents of the University of California
Medical Week News v. Sanofi-Aventis
Merkey v. Yahoo SCOX, Groklaw et. al.
Mobilisa v. Doe
MPAA v. The People
Nitke v. Ashcroft
OdioWorks v Apple
Online Policy Group v. Diebold
Request for Depublication of Novartis v. SHAC
RIAA v. Verizon Case Archive
Sapient v. Geller
Savage v. Council on American-Islamic Relations
Spocko and ABC/KSFO
Steve Jackson Games v. Secret Service Case Archive
Tiffany Inc. v. eBay, Inc.
Williams v. Donald

Hollywood v. DVD
2000 DMCA Rulemaking
2003 DMCA Rulemaking
2006 DMCA Rulemaking
2009 DMCA Rulemaking
Macrovision v. Sima
RealNetworks v. DVD CCA (RealDVD case)

Innovation
20th Century Fox v. Cablevision
Aimster
Arista v. Lime Wire
Blizzard v. BNETD
eBay v. MercExchange
Macrovision v. Sima
OdioWorks v Apple
Paramount v. ReplayTV
Perfect 10 v. Google
RealNetworks v. DVD-CCA (RealDVD case)
US v. ASCAP

Intellectual property
1-800 Contacts v. WhenU
20th Century Fox v. Cablevision
ACRA v. Lexmark
American Airlines v. Farechase Inc. Archive
Arista v. Lime Wire
Atlantic v. Howell
Authors Guild v. Google
Blackboard v. Hoffman
Blake v. Google
Blizzard v. BNETD
Bowers v. Baystate
Capitol v. Thomas
Chamberlain Group, Inc. v. Skylink Technologies, Inc.
Chicago Auto Show SHUTDOWN
Columbia v. Bunnell
CoStar v. LoopNet
Diehl v. Crook
Echostar v. Freetech
Electric Slide Litigation
Elektra v. Barker
Embroidery Software Protection Coalition v. Ebert & Weaver
Frankel v. Lyons (Barney)
Gatehouse Media Massachusetts I, Inc. v. The New York Times Co.
Huntsman v. Soderbergh
J.K. Harris v. Taxes.com Litigation
JibJab Media v. Ludlow Music ("This Land" Parody)
Kelly v. Arriba Soft
KSR v. Teleflex
Landmark and the Internet Archive
Lava v. Amurao
Lexmark v. Static Control Case Archive
Macrovision v. Sima
Marvel v. NCSoft
Medical Week News v. Sanofi-Aventis
MGM v. Grokster
MPAA v. The People
Napster Cases Archive
OdioWorks v Apple
Online Policy Group v. Diebold
Perfect 10 v. Google
Quanta v. LG
RealNetworks v. DVD-CCA (RealDVD case)
RIAA v. Charter Communications Archive
RIAA v. The People
Righthaven LLC v. Democratic Underground
Sapient v. Geller
Snow v. DirecTV
StorageTek v. Custom Hardware
The Betamax Case
Tiffany v. eBay
UMG v. Augusto
US v. ASCAP
Visa v. JSL Corporation

Locational privacy
US v Jones

No Downtime for Free Speech campaign
Chamber of Commerce v. Servin
Chicago Auto Show SHUTDOWN
Diehl v. Crook
Discover Communications and the Spankmaker
Electric Slide Litigation
Embroidery Software Protection Coalition v. Ebert & Weaver
Frankel v. Lyons (Barney)
Jones Day v Blockshopper
Landmark and the Internet Archive
Lenz v. Universal
Medical Week News v. Sanofi-Aventis
MoveOn, Brave New Films v. Viacom
OdioWorks v Apple
Online Policy Group v. Diebold
Sapient v. Geller
Savage v. Council on American-Islamic Relations
SHARK v. PRCA
Tiffany v. eBay
USP v. Durkee

NSA spying

Al-Haramain v. Bush
CCR v Bush
First Unitarian Church of Los Angeles v. NSA
Hepting v. AT&T
Jewel v. NSA
NSA Multi-District Litigation
NSA Spying - State Administrator Cases
Shubert v Bush
Verizon / MCI

Patents
eBay v. MercExchange
In re Bilski
KSR v. Teleflex
Merck v. Integra
Quanta v. LG
PATRIOT Act
Doe v. Mukasey (Doe v. Gonzalez, Doe v. Ashcroft)

Privacy
Authors Guild v. Google
AutoDesk v. ODA
Bernstein v. United States
Bunnell v. MPAA
Burd v. Cole
Columbia v. Bunnell
Doe v. Mukasey (Doe v. Gonzalez, Doe v. Ashcroft)
Echostar v. Freetech
In Re: Matter of Search Warrant (Boston College)
Internet Archive et al v Mukasey et al
Junger v. Daley
Long Haul v Regents of the University of California
NSA Multi-District Litigation
US v Jones
US v. Arnold
US v. Councilman
US v. Ropp
Warshak v. United States
Warshak v. USA
Terms Of (Ab)Use
Sony BMG Litigation Info
UMG v. Augusto
US v. Drew

Travel screening
United States v. Arnold

Uncategorized
Clement v. California
Newmark, et al., v. Turner Broadcasting System, Inc. et al.

Historical/miscellaneous cases
2600 Mall Case
AA v. Farechase
AlScan v. RemarQ
American Amusement v. Kendrick
Autodesk v. Oda
Avrahami v. USNWR
BITS Against the Empire & Spunk Press
Blackboard v. Hoffman
CMU Censorship
CRLP v. DOJ
Laurence Canter and Martha Siegel
Cincinnati BBSers v. Hamilton County
Clue v. InterNIC
Compuserve v. Patterson
DAETC v. FCC
DCI v. InterNIC
DISC v. InterNIC
DOJ v. Microsoft
Davis Case
Dennis Watson Case
Doe v. SEPTA
Doe v. MySpace Decision
DoubleClick Cases
EFGA v. GA
FBI v. Tucholka Tri Tac
FCC v. Pacifica
Ford v. Lane
Fred Cherry v. DOJ
Giacalone v. InterNic
Gilmore v. NSA
Hollis-Eden v. Wells
Intel v. Schwartz Convicted in 1995 of cracking passwords
United States v. Baker the U. of Michigan and the FBI
Knowledgenet v. InterNIC et al
Konop v. Hawaiian Airlines
LaMacchia
Lotus Cases
Loudon Library
MTV v. Curry
Medinex v. Awe2bad4mdnx
Montreal BBSes
Multnomah Library v. US
PGP & Phil Zimmermann
PROFS (Armstrong v. Exec. Offc. of the President)
Phiber Optik
RIAA v. Diamond
Roadrunner v. InterNIC
Rural Metro v. Doe
Scientology Cases
Sheehan v. Experian
Smithsonian
Stratton, Oakmont, Porush v. Prodigy
Toys 'R' Us v. Roadkills-R-Us
US v. Thomases
USTA v. FCC

See also

List of litigation involving the Wikimedia Foundation

External links
Links taken from EFF Cases Page ( Creative Commons licensed)

Electronic Frontier Foundation
Internet-related activism
Computer case law
Computing-related controversies and disputes
Intellectual property case law
Intellectual property activism
Privacy law

Case law lists by party or amicus